Antrophyum austroqueenslandicum (previously A. sp. Blue Pool) was a species of epiphytic or lithophytic fern known from subtropical rainforest in Lamington National Park in the state of Queensland, Australia. Only one plant was known in the wild and when this plant died the specimen was preserved and used to describe the species. Further searching in nearby habitat has not located any more specimens of this fern.

It is listed as Presumed Extinct under the Queensland Nature Conservation Act. However the habitat of this species is protected and has not suffered significant disturbance and other populations of this fern may still exist in unexplored areas of the McPherson Range. The scientifically unexplored nature of these mountains is shown by the recent discovery of two large tree species Eucryphia jinksii in 1995 and Eidothea hardeniana in 2000.

References

 Nature Conservation Act Extinct Species 
 Antrophyum Species of the World 

Ferns of Australia
Flora of Queensland
Extinct in the wild flora of Australia
Pteridaceae
Plants described in 1998